Bahrain Royal Medical Services (also known as Bahrain Defense Force Hospital) is one of the major hospitals in the Kingdom of Bahrain, and the only hospital where free health care is provided exclusively for non-civilians in the country.

Overview
Committed to advanced care and advanced caring, Bahrain Defense Force Royal Medical Services (BDFRMS) Hospitals Health System offers the region's largest network of primary care physicians, outpatient center and hospital. The System also includes a network of specialty care physicians, skilled nursing, elder health, behavioral health, rehabilitation and home care services, managed care and insurance programs and occupational health and wellness.

Nearly 4,000 physicians and employees comprise BDFRMS Hospitals Health System.

BDFRMS Hospitals Health System's goal is to provide comprehensive primary and community-based care-the kind of healthcare people need most-as well as access to the highest quality specialty care when necessary.

The Bahrain Defense Force Hospital has a total bed capacity of 400 beds including that of inpatient, outpatient and emergency patients. The hospital ranks as the second largest hospital in Bahrain, constituting all clinical infrastructure and highly trained medical staff.

The main mission of the BDF Hospital is to provide health care services for the Military and Interior forces (i.e. both primary and secondary health care), emergency services for the public, specialised medical for referral patients and government VIPs. All Bahrain residents and non-residents are entitled to free health care services and treatment.

1968 establishments in Bahrain
Hospital buildings completed in 1968
Hospitals in Bahrain
Hospitals established in 1968
Bahrain Defence Force